Rudolf (or Rudolph) Schanzer (12 January 1875 – 1944) was an Austrian playwright and journalist. He is primarily known for the numerous operetta librettos that he wrote for composers such as Leo Fall, Jean Gilbert, Emmerich Kálmán, and Ralph Benatzky. He was born in Vienna and died in Italy where he committed suicide after his arrest by the Gestapo.

Life and career
Schanzer was born into a Jewish family in Vienna where his father worked as a shipping agent. From 1894 to 1895 he studied law at the University of Vienna and then went to Paris where he worked as a private secretary and journalist. He also began writing theatrical pieces in his spare time. Some of his earliest works were for pantomimes and cabaret and variety shows. He then began collaborating on operetta librettos with his friends and fellow writers Rudolf Bernauer and Ernst Welisch. Their success led him to becoming a full-time librettist.  

During the course of his career he would write or co-write over 30 operetta and musical theatre librettos, many of which were later made into films. With the rise of Nazi Germany and the enactment of the antisemitic Nuremberg Laws in 1935, Schanzer left Berlin and moved to his villa in the Austrian spa town of Bad Ischl. He returned to Vienna in 1936, but following the German annexation of Austria in 1938, he fled to Abbazia, a town now in Croatia but then under Italian control. He tried to emigrate to the US or England but was unsuccessful. Schanzer was arrested by the Gestapo in 1944 and was to be deported to a concentration camp. He committed suicide while in custody by taking the poison which he had always carried with him after his flight from Austria.

Librettos
Librettos written or co-written by Schanzer include:
Der schwarze Mann, comic opera in 1 act composed by Oscar Straus; premiered Berlin, Secessionstheater, 23 December 1901
Filmzauber (with Rudolf Bernauer), Posse mit Gesang in 4 acts composed by Walter Kollo; premiered Berlin, 19 October 1912
 (with Rudolf Bernauer), operetta in 4 acts composed by Walter Kollo; premiered Berlin, Berliner Theater, 4 October 1913
Die tolle Komtess (with Rudolf Bernuauer), operetta in 3 acts composed by Walter Kollo; premiered Berlin, Berliner Theater, 21 February 1917
Blitzblaues Blut (with Rudolf Bernauer), operetta in 3 acts composed by Walter Kollo; premiered Berlin, Berliner Theater, 9 February 1918 
Sterne, die wieder leuchten (with Rudolf Bernauer), operetta in 3 acts composed by Walter Kollo; premiered Berlin, Berliner Theater, 6 September 1918
Die Frau im Hermelin (with Ernst Welisch), operetta in 3 acts composed by Jean Gilbert; premiered Berlin, Theater des Westens, 22 August 1919
Der Geiger von Lugano  (with Ernst Welisch ),  operetta in 3 acts composed by Jean Gilbert; premiered Berlin, Thalia Theater, 26 September 1920
Die Braut des Lucullus (with Ernst Welisch ),  operetta in 3 acts composed by Jean Gilbert; premiered Berlin, Theater des Westens, 26 August 1921
Madame Pompadour (with Ernst Welisch ), operetta in 3 acts composed by Leo Fall; premiered Berlin, Berliner Theater, 9 September 1922
Riquette (with Ernst Welisch), operetta in 3 acts composed by Oscar Straus; premiered Berlin, 17 January 1925
Die Teresina (with Ernst Welisch), operetta in 3 acts, composed by Oscar Straus; premiered Berlin, Deutsches Künstlertheater, 11 September 1925
Das Spiel um die Liebe (with Ernst Welisch), operetta in 3 acts composed by Jean Gilbert; premiered Berlin, Theater des Westens, 19 December 1925
Eine Frau von Format (with Ernst Welisch), operetta in 3 acts composed by Michael Krauss; premiered Berlin, Theater des Westens, 21 September 1927
Casanova (with Ernst Welisch ), operetta in 3 acts composed by Ralph Benatzky; premiered Berlin, Großes Schauspielhaus, 1 September 1928
 (with Ernst Welisch), operetta in 3 acts composed by Ralph Benatzky; premiered Berlin, Großes Schauspielhaus, 31 August 1929
Die erste Beste (with Ernst Welisch), operetta in 3 acts, composed by Oscar Straus; premiered Prague, Neues Deutsches Theater, 19 October 1929
Das Mädel am Steuer (with Ernst Welisch), musical comedy in 3 acts composed by Jean Gilbert; premiered Berlin, Komische Oper, 17 September 1930
Der Teufelsreiter (with Ernst Welisch), operetta in 3 acts composed by Emmerich Kálmán; premiered Vienna, Theater an der Wien, 10 March 1932

Filmography
 Maytime, directed by Louis J. Gasnier (1923, based on the operetta Wie einst im Mai) 
 Maytime, directed by Willi Wolff  (Germany, 1926, based on the operetta Wie einst im Mai) 
 The Lady in Ermine, directed by James Flood (1927, based on the operetta Die Frau im Hermelin)
 Madame Pompadour, directed by Herbert Wilcox (UK, 1927, based on the operetta Madame Pompadour)
 Princess Olala, directed by Robert Land (Germany, 1928, based on the operetta Prinzessin Olala) 
 A Woman with Style, directed by Fritz Wendhausen (Germany, 1928, based on the operetta Eine Frau von Format)
 The Crazy Countess, directed by Richard Löwenbein (Germany, 1928, based on the operetta Die tolle Komtess) 
 Bride of the Regiment, directed by John Francis Dillon (1930, based on the operetta Die Frau im Hermelin)
 (The 1937 film Maytime is not based on Rudolf Schanzer's play) 
 That Lady in Ermine, directed by Ernst Lubitsch (1948, based on the operetta Die Frau im Hermelin)
 Wie einst im Mai, directed by Thomas Engel  (West Germany, 1961, TV film, based on the operetta Wie einst im Mai)
 Madame Pompadour, directed by Eugen York (West Germany, 1974, TV film, based on the operetta Madame Pompadour)

References
 

Austrian operetta librettists
Writers from Vienna
1875 births
1944 suicides
Austrian Jews who died in the Holocaust
Suicides by poison
Suicides by Jews during the Holocaust
Suicides in Italy